The 2019 Kentucky Wildcats football team represented the University of Kentucky in the 2019 NCAA Division I FBS football season. The Wildcats played their home games at Kroger Field in Lexington, Kentucky, and competed in the East Division of the Southeastern Conference (SEC). They were led by seventh-year head coach Mark Stoops.

Preseason

SEC preseason poll
The 2019 SEC Media Days were held July 15–18 in Birmingham, Alabama. In the preseason media poll, Kentucky was projected to finish in sixth in the East Division.

Preseason All-SEC teams
The Wildcats had four players selected to the preseason all-SEC teams.

Offense

3rd team

Logan Stenberg – OL

Drake Jackson – C

Defense

3rd team

Kash Daniel – LB

Specialists

3rd team

Lynn Bowden – all-purpose player

Schedule
Kentucky announced its 2019 football schedule on September 18, 2018. The 2019 schedule consists of 8 home and 4 away games.

Schedule Source:

Personnel

Coaching staff

Game summaries

Toledo

Eastern Michigan

Florida

at Mississippi State

at South Carolina

Arkansas

at Georgia

Missouri

Tennessee

at Vanderbilt

UT Martin

Louisville

vs. Virginia Tech (Belk Bowl)

Rankings

Players drafted into the NFL

References

Kentucky
Kentucky Wildcats football seasons
Duke's Mayo Bowl champion seasons
Kentucky Wildcats football